Roselyn Emmanuel is a Saint Lucian former cricketer who played as a wicket-keeper and right-handed batter. She appeared in three One Day Internationals for the West Indies at the 1997 World Cup. She also played for, and captained, the United States at the 2009 Americas Championship. She played domestic cricket for Saint Lucia.

Career
Emmanuel represented the West Indies at the 1997 World Cup in India, appearing in all but one of her team's games. However, she only kept wicket against New Zealand, instead playing as a specialist opening batter in her other two appearances (against India and Denmark). Emmanuel continued playing for Saint Lucia for several years after her World Cup appearances. However, she never returned to the West Indian team. Emmanuel later emigrated to the United States, where she maintained her involvement with cricket. As one of the most experienced players in the country, she was appointed captain of the United States for the 2009 Americas Championship, its first international tournament.

References

External links
 
 

Living people
Date of birth missing (living people)
Year of birth missing (living people)
West Indian women cricketers
West Indies women One Day International cricketers
American women cricketers
Saint Lucian emigrants to the United States
Saint Lucian women cricketers
21st-century American women
Wicket-keepers